During the 2003–04 German football season, Borussia Dortmund competed in the Bundesliga.

Season summary
Dortmund failed to qualify for the Champions League group stage, and followed that up with a disappointing sixth-place finish in the Bundesliga. The club's poor form was mainly a result of playmaker Tomáš Rosický's absence through virtually half of the season. The poor form led to the dismissal of coach Matthias Sammer, while the club's economy got ever more strained.

Players

First-team squad
Squad at end of season

Left club during season

Competitions

Bundesliga

League table

Matches
 Schalke 04-Borussia Dortmund 2–2
 1–0 Hamit Altıntop 
 2–0 Hamit Altıntop 
 2–1 Flávio Conceição 
 2–2 Márcio Amoroso 
 Borussia Dortmund-Wolfsburg 4–0
 1–0 Tomáš Rosický 
 2–0 Tomáš Rosický 
 3–0 Márcio Amoroso 
 4–0 Jan Koller 
 Borussia Dortmund-1860 Munich 3–1
 1–0 Márcio Amoroso 
 2–0 Márcio Amoroso 
 3–0 Jan Koller 
 3–1 Francis Kioyo 
 Köln-Borussia Dortmund 1–0
 1–0 Dirk Lottner 
 Borussia Dortmund-Werder Bremen 2–1
 1–0 Ewerthon 
 1–1 Krisztián Lisztes 
 2–1 Valérien Ismaël 
 Stuttgart-Borussia Dortmund 1–0
 1–0 Kevin Kurányi 
 Borussia Dortmund-Freiburg 1–0
 1–0 Ewerthon 
 Eintracht Frankfurt-Borussia Dortmund 0–1
 0–1 Giuseppe Reina 
 Borussia Dortmund-Hannover 6–2
 1–0 Ewerthon 
 2–0 Lars Ricken 
 3–0 Sebastian Kehl 
 3–1 Vinícius 
 4–1 Jan Koller 
 5–1 Ewerthon 
 6–1 Ewerthon 
 6–2 Denis Wolf 
 Bochum-Borussia Dortmund 3–0
 1–0 Vahid Hashemian 
 2–0 Vahid Hashemian 
 3–0 Sunday Oliseh 
 Borussia Dortmund-Hamburg 3–2
 0–1 David Jarolím 
 0–2 Bernardo Romeo 
 1–2 Jan Koller 
 2–2 Jan Koller 
 3–2 Ewerthon 
 Bayern Munich-Borussia Dortmund 4–1
 1–0 Michael Ballack 
 1–1 Jan Koller 
 2–1 Willy Sagnol 
 3–1 Hasan Salihamidžić 
 4–1 Claudio Pizarro 
 Borussia Dortmund-Bayer Leverkusen 2–2
 1–0 Salvatore Gambino 
 2–0 Salvatore Gambino 
 2–1 Oliver Neuville 
 2–2 Marko Babić 
 Hansa Rostock-Borussia Dortmund 2–1
 1–0 Martin Max 
 1–1 Ewerthon 
 2–1 Martin Max 
 Borussia Dortmund-Hertha Berlin 1–1
 1–0 Leandro 
 1–1 Alexander Madlung 
 Mönchengladbach-Borussia Dortmund 2–1
 1–0 Igor Demo 
 1–1 Jan Koller 
 2–1 Slađan Ašanin 
 Borussia Dortmund-Kaiserslautern 1–1
 1–0 Jan Koller 
 1–1 Lincoln 
 Borussia Dortmund-Schalke 04 0–1
 0–1 Ebbe Sand 
 Wolfsburg-Borussia Dortmund 2–4
 1–0 Martin Petrov 
 1–1 Niclas Jensen 
 1–2 Jan Koller 
 1–3 Torsten Frings 
 1–4 Lars Ricken 
 2–4 Fernando Baiano 
 1860 Munich-Borussia Dortmund 0–2
 0–1 Ewerthon 
 0–2 Ewerthon 
 Borussia Dortmund-Köln 1–0
 1–0 Ewerthon 
 Werder Bremen-Borussia Dortmund 2–0
 1–0 Valérien Ismaël 
 2–0 Aílton 
 Borussia Dortmund-Stuuttgart 0–2
 0–1 Alexander Hleb 
 0–2 Horst Heldt 
 Freiburg-Borussia Dortmund 2–2
 1–0 Roda Antar 
 1–1 Dedê 
 1–2 Lars Hermel 
 2–2 Levan Tskitishvili 
 Borussia Dortmund-Eintracht Frankfurt 2–0
 1–0 Ewerthon 
 2–0 Jan Koller 
 Hannover-Borussia Dortmund 1–1
 0–1 Torsten Frings 
 1–1 Thomas Christiansen 
 Borussia Dortmund-Bochum 4–1
 1–0 Jan Koller 
 1–1 Peter Madsen 
 2–1 Salvatore Gambino 
 3–1 Torsten Frings 
 4–1 Ewerthon 
 Hamburg-Borussia Dortmund 0–2
 0–1 Torsten Frings 
 0–2 Jan Koller 
 Borussia Dortmund-Bayern Munich 2–0
 1–0 Ewerthon 
 2–0 Christian Wörns 
 Bayer Leverkusen-Borussia Dortmund 3–0
 1–0 Marko Babić 
 2–0 França 
 3–0 Dimitar Berbatov 
 Borussia Dortmund-Hansa Rostock 4–1
 1–0 Ahmed Reda Madouni 
 2–0 Ewerthon 
 3–0 Jan Koller 
 3–1 Martin Max 
 4–1 David Odonkor 
 Hertha Berlin-Borussia Dortmund 6–2
 1–0 Sebastian Kehl 
 2–0 Marcelinho 
 3–0 Fredi Bobič 
 3–1 Ewerthon 
 4–1 Artur Wichniarek 
 4–2 Ewerthon 
 5–2 Andreas Neuendorf 
 6–2 Nando Rafael 
 Borussia Dortmund-Mönchengladbach 3–1
 0–1 Ivo Ulich 
 1–1 Ewerthon 
 2–1 Dedê 
 3–1 Jan Koller 
 Kaiserslautern-Borussia Dortmund 1–1
 1–0 Vratislav Lokvenc 
 1–1 Jan Koller

Champions League

Third qualifying round

UEFA Cup

First round
 Dortmund 2-1 Austria Wien
 Austria Wein 0-1 Dortmund

Second round
 Dortmund 2-2 Sochaux
 Sochaux 4-0 Dortmund

Top scorers

Bundesliga
  Ewerthon 16
  Jan Koller 16
  Torsten Frings 4
  Márcio Amoroso 4
  Salvatore Gambino

References

Notes

Borussia Dortmund seasons
Borussia Dortmund